Eusebes, meaning "the Pious", was an epithet given to several Hellenistic monarchs:

 Antiochus IX Eusebes, Seleucid King
 Antiochus X Eusebes Philopator, Seleucid King
 Ariarathes IV Eusebes, King of Cappadocia
 Ariarathes V Eusebes Philopator, King of Cappadocia
 Ariarathes IX Eusebes Philopator, King of Cappadocia
 Ariarathes X Eusebes Philadelphos, King of Cappadocia
 Ariobarzanes III Eusebes Philorhomaios, King of Cappadocia

See also 
 Pius
 Euergetes
 Epiphanes (disambiguation)
 Eupator (disambiguation)

Ancient Greek titles
Epithets